Podbrđe  (Cyrillic: Подбрђе) is a village in Croatia that had a reported population of 180 people in 2011, 9 less than the villagers they held in 2001.

Populated places in Sisak-Moslavina County